Prunus × cistena, the purple leaf sand cherry or dwarf red-leaf plum, is a hybrid species of Prunus, the result of a cross between Prunus cerasifera (cherry plum or myrobalan plum) and Prunus pumila (sand cherry). A leggy bush or shrubby tree, it typically reaches a height of 1.5–2.5 meters and has a useful life of 10–20 years. The fruits are edible, if strong-tasting. Some people make jams or preserves from them. It is not advisable to eat the pits.

Frost-tolerant, purple leaf sand cherries can be grown up to USDA Hardiness Zone 2a. Commercial specimens are typically grafted to a rootstock from any of a number of other species, which will influence their growth form and final height. There are also a limited selection of cultivars available.

Prunus × cistena was developed by Niels Ebbesen Hansen in 1910. In 1993 it won the Royal Horticultural Society's Award of Garden Merit.

References

cistena
Hybrid prunus
Interspecific plant hybrids
Ornamental plant cultivars
Fruits originating in North America
Plants described in 1918